Edson Ismael Ramírez Ramos (born 10 July 2000) is a Mexican sport shooter. He won the silver medal in the men's 10 metres air rifle event at the 2019 Pan American Games held in Lima, Peru. He also won the bronze medal in the mixed 10 metres air rifle event together with Gabriela Martínez.

In 2018, he won the silver medal in the mixed 10 metre air rifle event at the Summer Youth Olympics held in Buenos Aires, Argentina. He also competed in the boys' 10 metre air rifle where he failed to qualify to compete in the final.

He represented Mexico at the 2020 Summer Olympics in Tokyo, Japan. He competed in the men's 10 metre air rifle event.

References

External links 
 

Living people
2000 births
Place of birth missing (living people)
Mexican male sport shooters
Pan American Games medalists in shooting
Pan American Games silver medalists for Mexico
Pan American Games bronze medalists for Mexico
Medalists at the 2019 Pan American Games
Shooters at the 2019 Pan American Games
Shooters at the 2018 Summer Youth Olympics
Central American and Caribbean Games gold medalists for Mexico
Competitors at the 2018 Central American and Caribbean Games
Central American and Caribbean Games medalists in shooting
Shooters at the 2020 Summer Olympics
Olympic shooters of Mexico
People from Ciudad Victoria
Sportspeople from Tamaulipas